José Javier Valentín Rosario (born September 19, 1975) is a Puerto Rican former professional baseball catcher. From -, he played for the Cincinnati Reds after playing with the Tampa Bay Devil Rays and four brief stints for the Minnesota Twins from -. He is the younger brother of former Major League Baseball second baseman José Valentín and the uncle of Philadelphia Phillies infielder Jesmuel Valentín. In , he hit .281 with a career-high 14 home runs as a backup catcher for the Reds. He is a switch-hitter. Valentín played briefly at first base and even more infrequently at third base in his time with Cincinnati.

Career

Playing career
Valentín was drafted on June 3, by the Minnesota Twins in the third round of the 1993 Major League Baseball draft. He made his major league debut on September 13, 1997, and ended up playing three seasons for the Twins.

On November 15, 2002, the Twins traded him with Matt Kinney to the Milwaukee Brewers for Minor League prospects Gerry Oakes and Matt Yeatman. A few months later, the Brewers sent him to the Tampa Bay Devil Rays for Jason Conti.

After becoming a free agent, Valentín signed with the Cincinnati Reds on January 8, 2004. He remained with the Reds for the five seasons mainly as a back-up catcher and a specialized pinch hitter. He signed a minor league deal with the Washington Nationals on February 3, to battle with Wil Nieves to be Washington's backup catcher. However, on March 28, he was reassigned to minor league camp, declined his assignment, and opted to become a free agent.

On May 14, Valentin signed a minor league deal with the New York Mets and was assigned to Triple-A Buffalo. He was released on June 22, 2009.

Coaching career
Valentin was named as the Hitting Coach for the Rochester Red Wings of the 2019 season.

See also
 List of Major League Baseball players from Puerto Rico

References

External links

1975 births
Living people
Atenienses de Manatí (baseball) players
Buffalo Bisons (minor league) players
Cangrejeros de Santurce (baseball) players
Cincinnati Reds players
Edmonton Trappers players
Elizabethton Twins players
Fort Myers Miracle players
Fort Wayne Wizards players
Gulf Coast Twins players
Hardware City Rock Cats players
Indios de Mayagüez players
Liga de Béisbol Profesional Roberto Clemente catchers
Major League Baseball catchers
Major League Baseball players from Puerto Rico
Minor league baseball coaches
Minnesota Twins players
New Britain Rock Cats players
People from Manatí, Puerto Rico
Puerto Rican expatriate baseball players in Canada
Salt Lake Buzz players
Tampa Bay Devil Rays players
2006 World Baseball Classic players